Dahlia tamaulipana is a species of flowering plant in the family Asteraceae. It is occasionally available from commercial suppliers.

References

tamaulipana
Endemic flora of Mexico
Flora of Tamaulipas
Plants described in 2018